Hassi Abdallah is a village in the commune of Ksabi, in Ouled Khoudir District, Béchar Province, Algeria. It is connected both Ksabi and the N6 national highway by local roads.

References

Neighbouring towns and cities

Populated places in Béchar Province